The State Assembly of the Republic of Mordovia is the regional parliament of Mordovia, a federal subject of Russia. A total of 48 deputies are elected for five-year terms.

Its members elect the head of the Republic of Mordovia for a period of five years.

Elections

2016

2021

List of chairmen

Supreme Council

State Assembly

Notes

References

Mordovia
Politics of Mordovia
Mordovia